Goals on Sunday is a British football highlights television programme which aired on the ITV Yorkshire Television region initially between 1989 and 1992 in its first format, and then again from 1992 to 2002.

Original Format
The show was a 30-minute programme featuring action from Saturday's games featuring the region's teams in top four divisions beginning with a main 10-minute featured match, mostly commentated by John Helm and presented by Nick Powell. Leeds United or one of the Sheffield teams (Wednesday or United) were usually featured in the main game with interviews with players and managers afterwards.

With the formation of the Premier League in 1992 Sky Sports won the rights to show the games meaning the show continued showing games from the Second, Third and Fourth levels. The last show aired on the final weekend of the 2001–02 season.

History
The show was usually shown in a mid day slot on Sunday lunchtime showing the previous days Football highlights. Teams featured were from the Yorkshire Television region's, the area covered all of Yorkshire and Lincolnshire including a small number of sides from neighbouring Derbyshire and Nottinghamshire that are situated close to the borders with Yorkshire.

From 1992 to 1993 when ITV lost the rights to show First Division matches to Sky Sports, whilst highlights rights were given to the BBC for their Match of the Day show. The highlights and any live match feature would initially go out under the title Your Match. but the name "Goals on Sunday" was revived. There were also live Football League games, that featured teams in the second tier, were shown until 2002 called "Goals on Sunday: Live".

The show was replaced by Soccer Night which featured the Yorkshire TV region's Football League clubs until 2004.

Teams featured

References

External links
 Goals On Sunday - Part 2 Mar 1, 1992 - YouTube

1989 British television series debuts
2002 British television series endings
1980s British sports television series
1990s British sports television series
2000s British sports television series
English Football League on television
English-language television shows
ITV Sport
Television series by ITV Studios
Television series by Yorkshire Television